Buddireddipatti is a village in Dharmapuri district, Tamil Nadu, India.

Geography
It is located at Dharmapuri district, comes under Pappireddipatti taluk.

Location
Buddireddipatti is connected by a rail. Nearest airport is Salem Airport.

References

Villages in Dharmapuri district